Heart and Soul is the debut album from X Factor winner Steve Brookstein, released on 9 May 2005. It was released only several months after his X Factor win and therefore he opted to produce a record of cover songs of classic soul and jazz songs, including "If You Don't Know Me By Now" and his debut #1 single, "Against All Odds".

Commercial performance
The album reached No. 1 on the UK Albums Chart in 2005 with first week sales of 50,989. The album has sold 105,338 copies in the UK as of November 2015.

Track listing

References

External links
Track listing at Amazon
Steve Brookstein's official website

2005 debut albums
Steve Brookstein albums
Albums produced by Brian Rawling